St Just, known as St Just in Penwith, is a town and civil parish in the Penwith  district of Cornwall, England, United Kingdom. It lies along the B3306 road which connects St Ives to the A30 road. The parish encompasses the town of St Just and the nearby settlements of  Trewellard, Pendeen and Kelynack: it is bounded by the parishes of Morvah to the north-east, Sancreed and Madron to the east, St Buryan and Sennen to the south and by the sea in the west. St Just parish, which includes Pendeen and the surrounding area, has a population of 4,637 (2011 census). An electoral ward of the same name also exists: the population of this ward at the same census was 4,812.

St Just lies within the Cornwall Area of Outstanding Natural Beauty (AONB). St Just is one of only two towns included within the Cornwall AONB.

History
The identity of Saint Just is not known. Cornwall's long resistance to the edicts of Canterbury and Rome makes it most unlikely that the saint was Archbishop Justus of Canterbury, as some sources claim. Another possibility is the 6th- or 7th-century Saint Iestyn, who is said to have been the son of Geraint ab Erbin, a ruler of Dumnonia. In 1478 William of Worcester found that the church was believed to contain the bones of Justus of Trieste.

Among the prehistoric antiquities nearby is Ballowall Barrow, a chambered tomb. St Just is one of the most ancient mining districts in Cornwall, and remains of ancient pre-industrial and more modern mining activity have had a considerable impact on the nearby landscape.

Bosworlas, in St Just parish, was said by Henry Jenner to have been named as  after Gorlois, the legendary duke of Cornwall, who he believed was a real fifth or sixth century figure, either a petty chief and vassal of the Royal House of Dumnonia, or of the line of the original chiefs of the Dumnonii if the kings of Dumnonia were the leaders of the Britons displaced by the Saxons. He notes its closeness to Bosigran , Gorlois's wife in Arthurian legend.

Churches and schools

The parish church of St Just is a fine 15th-century building. In 1336 the church was rebuilt and dedicated by John Grandisson, Bishop of Exeter; however only the chancel of this church survives and the nave and aisles are 15th-century in date. There are two Methodist chapels.

St Just is the home of Cape Cornwall School which also serves Sennen, Sancreed, Pendeen, St Buryan and other places in the district.

There are seven Cornish crosses in the parish; there are two in the vicarage garden and one built into the church wall. Other crosses are at Leswidden, Nanquidno and Kenidjack (two). Boslow Cross is 550 yds (500 m) NW of Boslow Farm (ref. no.  1003110).

Mining
The ancient settlement has a strong mining history and was during the 19th century one of the most important mining districts in Cornwall both for copper and for tin. Mines within the area included Boscaswell Downs, Balleswidden, Parknoweth, Boscean, Wheal Owles, Wheal Boys, Levant, Botallack and Geevor (which closed in 1990).  Geevor mine is now a tourist attraction which allows visitors to explore Cornish Mining heritage.  The boom in 19th-century mining saw a dramatic increase in the population of St Just, the 1861 census records the population figure as being 9,290; however, like other areas in Cornwall the population declined with the collapse in the tin trade in the 19th century. The town also suffered from the decision of the Great Western Railway to abandon its plans to make St Just the terminus of the London mainline to Cornwall. It was announced in July 2006 that the St Just mining district and the rest of the historic mining areas of Cornwall had become the Cornwall and West Devon Mining Landscape World Heritage Site.

Geography
The nearby Cot Valley has a stream which runs to the sea. The area has been heavily mined, as was the area around St Just. The round boulders in the Cot Valley Cove here are of specific scientific interest. Also nearby is Cape Cornwall.

Local government
For the purposes of local government classification St Just is a town and elects a Mayor every 12 months from among the St Just Town Councillors. The St Just Town Council was created following the re-structuring of English Local Government in 1974, St Just having been an urban district council until then. Principal local government functions are now undertaken by Cornwall Council.

St Just was originally part of the Penzance Poor Law Union until 1894 when it was incorporated into the West Penwith Rural District. In 1897 St Just in Penwith parish formed the sole basis of St Just Urban District. In 1974 the urban district was included in Penwith District, until that was abolished in 2009.

Culture and local traditions
St Just is home to the popular Lafrowda festival a seven-day community and arts celebration usually held in mid July.

A more ancient celebration associated with the town is St Just Feast which is held every year to celebrate the dedication of the parish church on 13 July 1336.  Feast celebrations were moved to the Sunday nearest to All Saints' Day in 1536 following an Act of Henry VIII which means it usually take place at the end of October / beginning of  November. Feast itself is a two-day event with a church service and civic procession being held on Feast Sunday and a larger scale popular celebration being held on Feast Monday (which includes a meeting of the Western Hunt). A description of St Just Feast, from 1882, follows:

"Rich and poor still at this season keep open house, and all the young people from St. Just who are in service for many miles around, if they can possibly be spared, go home on the Saturday and stay until the Tuesday morning. A small fair is held in the streets on Monday evening, when the young men are expected to treat their sweethearts liberally, and a great deal of "foolish money" that can be ill afforded is often spent"

St Just also has a 'Plen an Gwarry' (Cornish for "playing place"), locally pronounced 'Plain an Gwarry'. These sites were used historically for open-air performance, entertainment and instruction. St Just's Plen an Gwarry occasionally hosts productions of the Cornish Ordinalia mystery plays.

St Just has a healthy artistic scene, including the painter Kurt Jackson who has made several television appearances. Contemporary singer and comedian Jethro from nearby St Buryan played for St Just Rugby Club and has recorded a song entitled "St Just".

The folk singer Martha Tilston released an album in 2010 called Lucy and the Wolves. This features a range of songs inspired by Cornwall. The first song on the album is called The Cape and is based upon Cape Cornwall in St Just. She has performed in Penzance a number of times and now lives in Penwith.

The children's animated television series Jungle Junction is produced by Spider Eye Productions of St. Just.

The local community radio station is Coast FM (formerly Penwith Radio), which broadcasts on 96.5 and 97.2 FM.

The Star Inn is sometimes called the last proper pub in Cornwall. Its clientele includes bird watchers who are attracted by the local wildlife.

Bus services 
St Just bus station is served by routes 7, 8, A3 and A17. Services 7 and 8 are provided by Transport for Cornwall. A3 is provided by First Kernow and the two providers jointly run the A17 service. 

7: Penzance to Lands End via St Just
8: Long Rock(Morrison’s) to St Just via Sancreed
A3: St Ives to Lands End via St Just (Atlantic Coaster)
A17: St Ives to Pendeen via Penzance and St Just

Twinning
St Just is twinned with Huelgoat, Bro-Gernev, Brittany. The town is also twinned, in partnership with Penzance, with Bendigo in the State of Victoria, Australia and with Nevada City in California, USA as a result of the historical links through the many people from the area who emigrated to the two destinations, mostly in the late 19th century, to find a better life in the mines there. There is still an area of Bendigo known as St. Just Point.

Notable residents
Edward Charles Grenfell was raised to the peerage in 1935 as Baron St Just, of St Just in Penwith in the County of Cornwall. 
Francis Oats (1848–1918), Cornish miner who became chairman of De Beers diamond company
 Lt Col J. H. Williams (Elephant Bill), soldier and elephant trainer

Gallery

References

External links

St Just Town Council

 
Towns in Cornwall
Civil parishes in Cornwall
Penwith